Dehloran (also Romanized as Dehlorān) is a city in and the capital of Dehloran County, Ilam Province, Iran. At the 2006 census, its population was 27,602, in 5,787 families. The city lies along Road 64, near the Iraqi border. A national natural monument lies in the north-eastern part of the city.

Demographics 
The city is populated by Kurds and Lurs.

Deh Luran plain 
Dehloran is located in the northern part of Deh Luran plain. The ancient site of Chogha Sefid is just to the west of the village.

Deh Luran plain in the south of Ilam Province, along with the Susiana plain in Khuzestan to the southwest, has been the subject of the longest and the most extensive archaeological research in Iran. These two areas have been culturally very similar during the Chalcolithic age. The important sites on Deh Luran plain are Ali Kosh, Chogha Sefid, and Tepe Sabz.

Culturally, Deh Luran plain is known as a part of “Greater Susiana”.

References 

Populated places in Dehloran County
Cities in Ilam Province
Kurdish settlements in Ilam Province
Luri settlements in Ilam Province